The Spotswood Public Schools are a comprehensive community public school district that serves students in pre-kindergarten through twelfth grade from Helmetta and Spotswood, in Middlesex County, New Jersey, United States.

Students from Helmetta, a non-operating district, attend school in Spotswood beginning in grammar school. Students from Milltown attend the high school as part of a sending/receiving relationship with the Milltown Public Schools.

As of the 2020–21 school year, the district, comprised of four schools, had an enrollment of 1,610 students and 136.5 classroom teachers (on an FTE basis), for a student–teacher ratio of 11.8:1.

The district is classified by the New Jersey Department of Education as being in District Factor Group "DE", the fifth-highest of eight groupings. District Factor Groups organize districts statewide to allow comparison by common socioeconomic characteristics of the local districts. From lowest socioeconomic status to highest, the categories are A, B, CD, DE, FG, GH, I and J.

Schools
Schools in the district (with 2020–21 enrollment data from the National Center for Education Statistics) are:
Elementary schools
G. Austin Schoenly Elementary School with 207 students in grades PreK-1)
Jessica Ayers, Principal
E. Raymond Appleby Elementary School with 334 students in grades 2-5
Nancy Torchiano, Principal
Middle school
Spotswood Memorial Middle School with 349 students in grades 6-8
Jennifer Asprocolas, Principal
High school
Spotswood High School with 692 students in grades 9-12
Amy Jablonski, Principal

Administration
Core members of the district's administration are:
Graham Peabody, Superintendent
Vita Marino, Business Administrator / Board Secretary

Board of Education
The district's board of education is comprised of nine members who set policy and oversee the fiscal and educational operation of the district through its administration. As a Type II school district, the board's trustees are elected directly by voters to serve three-year terms of office on a staggered basis, with either one or two seats up for election each year held (since 2012) as part of the November general election. The board appoints a superintendent to oversee the district's day-to-day operations and a business administrator to supervise the business functions of the district.

References

External links
Spotswood Public Schools

School Data for the Spotswood Public Schools, National Center for Education Statistics

Spotswood, New Jersey
New Jersey District Factor Group DE
School districts in Middlesex County, New Jersey